Francis Xavier Mugadzi (20 February 1931 in Gokomere – 6 February 2004) was a Zimbabwean clergyman and bishop for the Roman Catholic Diocese of Gweru. He became ordained in 1964. He was appointed bishop in 1988. He died on 6 February 2004.

References

1931 births
2004 deaths
20th-century Roman Catholic bishops in Zimbabwe
21st-century Roman Catholic bishops in Zimbabwe
People from Masvingo Province
Roman Catholic bishops of Gweru